Hum Pashto 1 is a Pakistani Pashto satellite television station in Pakistan. The channel broadcasts 24 hours a day, providing variety of shows, dubbed Urdu Hum TV dramas to Pashto language and entertainment programs to the Pashtun population of Pakistan. Hum Pashto 1 delivers first run musical shows with the purpose of entertainment as well as hunting the talent.

The main office of Hum Pashto 1 is located in Islamabad, Pakistan. It also has smaller regional offices in Peshawar and Quetta.

See also

 hum network limited
 hum News
 List of Pakistani television stations

References

External links

Television stations in Islamabad
Hum Network Limited
Television channels and stations established in 2014
Mass media in Peshawar
Pashto mass media
Television stations in Pakistan